The table tennis competition at the 2010 Summer Youth Olympics took place in Singapore Indoor Stadium between 21 and 26 August, with training hall set in National University of Singapore (NUS).
64 athletes composed of 32 boys and 32 girls at the age between 14 and 16 (born between 1 January 1994 and 31 December 1995) competed in different events of Men's Singles and Women's Singles.
Further, each athlete paired with another athlete of the opposite sex participated in Mixed Team event. Each team match consisted of the best of three matches. The Women's Singles was played first, followed by Men's Singles and Mixed Doubles.

Qualifiers

Singles 
A total of 64 athletes qualified mainly from tournaments including ITTF Cadet Challenge, five ITTF Junior Circuit events, and five continental qualification tournaments (Africa, Asia, Europe, Pan America, Oceania). The others qualified from ITTF under 15 world ranking and the host National Olympic Committee (NOC). The maximum number of athletes per NOC was one man and one woman.

Mixed team
Qualified athletes from the same NOC teamed up first (17 teams).
The remaining players formed continental mixed teams as a second option (2 African teams, 6 European teams, 3 Pan American teams), and an intercontinental team was the last consideration (4 teams).

Medal summary

Medal table

Events

References

 
2010 Summer Youth Olympics events
2010 in table tennis
2010
Table tennis in Singapore